Juy Bazm (also Romanized as Jūy Bazm; also known as Jūb Bazm, Ju-i-Bāz, and Khūy Bazm) is a village in Sarvestan Rural District, in the Central District of Bavanat County, Fars Province, Iran. At the 2006 census, its population was 84, in 25 families.

References 

Populated places in Bavanat County